The Chone River is a river of Ecuador situated in the Manabí Province. The river is sourced from the mountains and flows into the Bahía de Caráquez (Bay of Caráquez) in the Pacific Ocean, near the town of Bahía de Caráquez.

Dams
The large Esperanza Dam (Represa de Esperanza) was completed on the Chone in 1985. It does not have any hydroelectric power component, but was constructed solely for irrigation and flood control.

See also
Isla Corazón
List of rivers of Ecuador

Notes

References
 www.codeso.com / Map of Manabí Province
 Rand McNally, The New International Atlas, 1993.

Rivers of Ecuador
Geography of Manabí Province